Fall Creek is an unincorporated community and census-designated place in Fall Creek Township, Adams County, Illinois, United States. Fall Creek is located along Interstate 172 southwest of Payson.

Fall Creek takes its name from a nearby creek of the same name, which was named for a waterfall along its course. A post office called Falls Creek was established in 1861, and closed in 1866. The post office was reestablished in 1872, the name was changed to Fallcreek in 1894, and the post office was discontinued in 1909.

Geography 

Demographics
As of the 2020 census there were 31 people, 14 households, and 14 families residing in the CDP. The racial makeup of the CDP was 93.55% White, 3.23% Asian, and 3.23% from two or more races.

References

Unincorporated communities in Adams County, Illinois
Unincorporated communities in Illinois